The yellow-winged blackbird (Agelasticus thilius) is a species of bird in the family Icteridae.
It is found in Argentina, Bolivia, Brazil, Chile, Paraguay, Peru, and Uruguay.

Its natural habitats are swamps, intertidal marshes, and pastureland.

References

yellow-winged blackbird
Birds of the Bolivian Andes
Birds of Chile
Birds of Argentina
Birds of Uruguay
yellow-winged blackbird
Taxonomy articles created by Polbot